Brazil  (also known as Stars and Guitars) is a 1944 American musical comedy film directed by Joseph Santley and starring Tito Guízar, Virginia Bruce and Edward Everett Horton. It is set in Brazil, and involves a composer masquerading as twins, trying to win the hand of an anti-Latin novelist.

The film also features Brazilian singer Aurora Miranda, as well as American singing cowboy Roy Rogers in a cameo appearance as himself.

Cast
 Tito Guízar as Miguel Soares
 Virginia Bruce as Nicky Henderson
 Edward Everett Horton as Everett St. John Everett
 Robert Livingston as Rod Walker
 Veloz and Yolanda as themselves
 Fortunio Bonanova as Senhor Renaldo Da Silva
 Richard Lane as Edward Graham
 Frank Puglia as Senhor Machado
 Aurora Miranda as Bailarina, Specialty Dancer
 Alfredo DeSa as Master of Ceremonies (as Alfred de Sa)
 Henry De Silva as Comerciante
 Rico De Montez as Airport Official
 Leonardo Scavino as Reporter (as Leon Lenoir)
 Roy Rogers as himself, Roy Rogers
 Trigger as Trigger, Roy's Horse
 Billy Daniel as Dancer (as Billy Daniels)

Awards
The film was nominated for three Academy Awards:

 Music (Scoring of a Musical Picture)
 Best Original Song: Ary Barroso for Rio de Janeiro
 Sound Recording (Daniel J. Bloomberg)

See also
List of American films of 1944

References

External links
 

1944 films
1940s English-language films
Films directed by Joseph Santley
Films scored by Walter Scharf
Republic Pictures films
1944 musical comedy films
1944 romantic comedy films
Films set in Brazil
American romantic musical films
American musical comedy films
Films about composers
Films produced by Robert North
1940s romantic musical films
American black-and-white films
1940s American films